Asbu or Esbu may refer to:
 Asbu, Ardabil
 Asbu, Khalkhal, Ardabil Province
 Esbu, Mazandaran
 Arab States Broadcasting Union (ASBU)